Eurico Lara (24 January 1897 – 6 November 1935), was a Brazilian footballer.

Biography
He was born in Uruguaiana. Eurico Lara played for Grêmio Foot-Ball Porto Alegrense from 1920 to 1935. He played his last match on 23 September 1935, when his club defeated Internacional 2–0. Due to cardiac problems, he was substituted during half-time, dying approximately two months later in Porto Alegre. According to legend, he died during that match, after defending a penalty shot by his brother. He is mentioned in Grêmio's anthem.

References

1897 births
1935 deaths
Brazilian footballers
Grêmio Foot-Ball Porto Alegrense players
Association football goalkeepers